General elections were held in Vanuatu on 2 September 2008. In July the Melanesian Progressive Party requested that they be postponed, contesting the constitutionality of the Peoples Representation Act No. 33 of 2007, which allegedly enabled voters in certain constituencies to vote in two constituencies. The Principal Electoral Officer, Martin Tete, confirmed that the election would take place on 2 September, as scheduled. The day was declared a national holiday, to encourage people to vote.

Over three hundred candidates, of which nine women, stood for election, representing twenty-five political parties and approximately eighty independents. There were 170,000 registered voters, and fifty-two seats to fill in Parliament in 17 multi-member constituencies.

Preliminary results
Unofficial preliminary results were expected on 3 September 2008, with official results expected to take up to a week. Two veteran politicians, the incumbent finance minister Willie Jimmy and former PM Barak Sopé, appear to have failed to be reelected, while the independent Ralph Regenvanu appeared to have got the most votes in his constituency of Port Vila and the leaders of the Green Confederation (Moana Carcasses) as well as of the Vanuatu Republican Party (Maxime Carlot Korman) as well as the deputy PM Edward Natapei were returned to parliament.

According to unofficial results, the ruling coalition was likely returned to power in the election; about 18 of the 49 MPs standing for re-election were not reelected, and Vanuatu's oldest party, the Vanua'aku Party, was seen to have gained the largest number of seats with 10 seats. Prime Minister Ham Lini's National United Party appears to have won at least seven seats, as have the Vanuatu Republican Party and the Union of Moderate Parties. Nine other parties and five independents also appear to have made it into Parliament.

The Vanuatu Electoral Commission has announced that it will take several days before official results are available, and ABC Radio Australia reports that, due to negotiations in establishing a ruling coalition once results are known, "it could be a week or two before it's clear just who will be leading the next Vanuatu government".

On 9 September, it was reported that the Vanua'aku Party (VP) and the National United Party were negotiating to form a coalition government, which would also include at least one more party. Under the agreement the new coalition government would include 33 of the 52 members of parliament. Deputy PM and VP leader Edward Natapei would become Prime Minister, while outgoing Prime Minister Ham Lini would become Natapei's Deputy Prime Minister. However, the leader of the Vanuatu Republican Party, Maxime Korman, now claims he has enough votes to form his own government and become Prime Minister. The ultimate results of the election are still unpredictable.

Results
Final results were announced on 10 September 2008. The Vanua'aku Party had won the most seats (11 out of 52) and Edward Natapei was expected to become prime minister; he was expected to select outgoing prime minister Ham Lini (National United Party) as his deputy. However, Maxime Carlot Korman of the Vanuatu Republican Party also claimed he had enough votes to form the government. Natapei was elected by Parliament on 22 September, winning with 27 to 25 votes against Korman in a secret ballot.

Subsequent by-elections
 2009 Southern Islands by-election, following the death of Ture Kailo, Vanua'aku MP for the Southern Islands. By-election won by Vanua'aku Party candidate Philip Charley.

Analysis
Derek Brien, of the Pacific Policy Institute of Public Policy in Port Vila, made the following comment on the election:
"In effect we've had two elections here in Vanuatu. We've got the election here in town, Port Vila, and Efate, the island on which it's situated, and then the rest of the country where 80 per cent of the population lives. And I say that because in the lead up to the election a lot of the media, a lot of the analysts were predicting a mood for change. I think what we forgot in that debate, or in that discussion in the lead up to the election, what was the rest of the country talking about. The rural areas where the majority of people don't have access to newspapers, televisions and, in the last few years, radio because there's been a problem with the transmitter. And in a lot of cases the rural electorate has been totally disengaged from both the government process and certainly the political process. It's not about policy basis down there. It's about patronage. It's about personalities."

See also
List of members of the Parliament of Vanuatu (2008–2012)

References

Vanuatu
General
Elections in Vanuatu
Vanuatu